The Free Trade Area of the Americas (FTAA) was a proposed agreement to eliminate or reduce the trade barriers among all countries in the Americas, excluding Cuba. Negotiations to establish the FTAA ended in failure, however, with all parties unable to reach an agreement by the 2005 deadline they had set for themselves.

History
In the last round of negotiations, trade ministers from 34 countries met in Miami, Florida, in the United States, in November 2003 to discuss the proposal. The proposed agreement was an extension of the North American Free Trade Agreement (NAFTA) between Canada, Mexico, and the United States. Discussions have faltered over similar points as the Doha Development Round of World Trade Organization (WTO) talks; developed nations sought expanded trade in services and increased intellectual property rights, while less developed nations sought an end to agricultural subsidies and free trade in agricultural goods. Similar to the WTO talks, Brazil took a leadership role among the less developed nations, while the United States took a similar role for the developed nations.

Origins
Free Trade Area of the Americas began with the Summit of the Americas in Miami, Florida, on December 11, 1994, but the FTAA came to public attention during the Quebec City Summit of the Americas, held in Canada in 2001, a meeting targeted by massive anti-corporatization and anti-globalization protests. The Miami negotiations in 2003 met similar protests, though not as large.

Disagreements
In previous negotiations, the United States had pushed for a single comprehensive agreement to reduce trade barriers for goods, while increasing intellectual property protection. Specific intellectual property protections could include Digital Millennium Copyright Act style copyright protections similar to the U.S.-Australia Free Trade Agreement. Another protection would likely have restricted the importation or cross importation of pharmaceuticals, similar to the proposed agreement between the United States and Canada. Brazil posed a three-track approach that called for a series of bilateral agreements to reduce specific tariffs on goods, a hemispheric pact on rules of origin, and a dispute resolution process Brazil proposed to omit the more controversial issues from the FTA, leaving them to the WTO.

The location of the FTA Secretariat was to have been determined in 2005. The contending cities were: Atlanta, Chicago, Galveston, Houston, San Juan, and Miami in the United States; Cancún and Puebla in Mexico; Panama City, Panama; and Port of Spain, Trinidad and Tobago. The U.S. city of Colorado Springs also submitted its candidacy in the early days but subsequently withdrew. Miami, Panama City and Puebla served successively an interim secretariat headquarters during the negotiation process.

The last summit was held at Mar del Plata, Argentina, in November 2005, but no agreement on FTA was reached. Of the 39 countries present at the negotiations, 20 pledged to meet again in 2006 to resume negotiations, but no meeting took place. The failure of the Mar del Plata summit to establish a comprehensive FTA agenda augured poorly.

Current status
The FTAA missed the targeted deadline of 2005, which followed the stalling of useful negotiations of the World Trade Organization Ministerial Conference of 2005. Over the next few years, some governments, most notably the United States, not wanting to lose any chance of hemispheric trade expansion moved in the direction of establishing a series of bilateral trade deals. The leaders planned further discussions at the 6th Summit of the Americas in Cartagena, Colombia in 2012, but these discussions did not take place.

As of 2022, U.S. trade policy neglected Latin America in favor of competition with China after failure of the Trans-Pacific Partnership, and resolving disputes with the European Union.

Membership
The following countries were planned to be part of the Free Trade Area of the Americas:

Support and opposition
A vocal critic of the FTAA was Venezuelan president Hugo Chávez, who has described it as an "annexation plan" and a "tool of imperialism" for the exploitation of Latin America. As a counterproposal to this initiative, Chávez promoted the Bolivarian Alliance for the Americas (Alianza Bolivariana para las Américas, ALBA) which emphasizes energy and infrastructure agreements. Evo Morales of Bolivia has referred to the U.S.-backed Free Trade Area of the Americas, as "an agreement to legalize the colonization of the Americas".

On the other hand, the then presidents of Brazil, Luiz Inácio Lula da Silva, and Argentina, Néstor Kirchner, have stated that they do not oppose the FTAA but they do demand that the agreement provide for the elimination of U.S. agriculture subsidies, the provision of effective access to foreign markets and further consideration towards the needs and sensibilities of its members.

One of the most contentious issues of the treaty proposed by the United States is with concerns to patents and copyrights. Critics claim that if the measures proposed by the United States were implemented and applied this would reduce scientific research in Latin America. On the Council of Canadians web site, Barlow wrote: "This agreement sets enforceable global rules on patents, copyrights and trademark. It has gone far beyond its initial scope of protecting original inventions or cultural products and now permits the practice of patenting plants and animal forms as well as seeds. It promotes the private rights of corporations over local communities and their genetic heritage and traditional medicines".

On the weekend of April 20, 2001, the 3rd Summit of the Americas was a summit held in Quebec City, Canada. This international meeting was a round of negotiations regarding a proposed FTAA.

Agreements
There are currently 34 countries in the Western Hemisphere, stretching from Canada to Chile that still have the FTAA as a long-term goal. The Implementation of a full multilateral FTAA between all parties could be made possible by enlargement of existing agreements.  At this point Agreements within the Area of the Americas include:

Previous agreements
 Canada: Canada–United States Free Trade Agreement (1988; superseded by the NAFTA)
 Canada, Mexico and United States: North American Free Trade Agreement (1994; superseded by the USMCA)
 Costa Rica- Dominican Republic (superseded by DR-CAFTA)
 Costa Rica- Trinidad and Tobago (superseded by a Costa Rica – CARICOM FTA).

Current agreements 

 Canada, Mexico and United States: United States–Mexico–Canada Agreement (USMCA; 2020)
 Costa Rica, El Salvador, Guatemala, Honduras, Nicaragua, Dominican Republic and United States: Dominican Republic–Central America Free Trade Agreement (DR-CAFTA; 2008)
 Chile, Colombia, Mexico and Peru: Pacific Alliance (2012)
 Chile–United States Free Trade Agreement (2004)
 Peru–United States Trade Promotion Agreement (2007)
 United States–Colombia Free Trade Agreement (2011)
 Panama–United States Trade Promotion Agreement (2011)
 Canada – Chile
 Canada – Colombia
 Canada – Costa Rica
 Canada – Honduras
 Canada – Panama
 Canada – Peru
 Chile – Mexico
 Chile – Costa Rica
 Colombia – CARICOM
 Colombia – Costa Rica
 Colombia – Northern Triangle
 Costa Rica – Mexico
 Costa Rica – CARICOM
 Mexico – Nicaragua
 Mexico – Uruguay
 Argentina, Brazil, Paraguay, Uruguay and Venezuela – Mercosur (1991)
 Bolivia, Colombia, Ecuador and Peru – Andean Community (1969)

Proposed agreements
 Active negotiations
 Canada-CARICOM:
 Canada-Central America (CA4TA – Guatemala, El Salvador, Nicaragua, Honduras)
 Canada-Mexico-Peru-Chile [among other Pacific nations]: Trans-Pacific Partnership

 Negotiations on hold
 CARICOM-Mercosur:
 United States-Ecuador: U.S.-Ecuador Free Trade Agreement
 CARICOM-North American Free Trade Agreement, first discussed in 1993–1994

Security pacts
 United States-Central America-Mexico (Mérida Initiative) 
 United States-CARICOM-Dominican Republic (Partnership for Prosperity and Security in the Caribbean

See also
 Rules of Origin
Market access
Free-trade area
Tariffs
 Miami model
 Pacific Alliance
 Protection of Broadcasts and Broadcasting Organizations Treaty
 Transatlantic Free Trade Area (TAFTA)
 Community of Latin American and Caribbean States
 Union of South American Nations

References

External links

  The Free Trade Area of the Americas (FTAA) process – official home page
  Comparing the official agreement and alternative visions
 The Rise of the New Global Elite – Statements of the former five-term Federal Reserve Chairman Alan Greenspan
 Chilean and Foreign Policy
 Mit.edu 
 Harvard.edu
  FTAA Delayed, Not Over. By Eric Farnsworth, Council of the Americas, December 2005
 Whither the FTAA? (November 10, 2005), Guyana Chronicle Newspaper
  Canada, Chile thwart U.S.–Brazilian plan, The Washington Times (washtimes.com  AP)
  Myths of the FTAA, FoodFirst.org Institute for Food and Development Policy
  Why say no to FTAA, bilaterals.org
  The Free Trade Area of the Americas and the Threat to Social Programs, Environmental Sustainability and Social Justice in Canada and the Americas

FTAA
Foreign relations of Argentina
Politics of the Americas
Trade blocs
United States federal trade legislation
Proposed free trade agreements
Free-trade areas
Foreign trade of Argentina